{{Speciesbox
| image = Geoglossum atropurpureum 399563.jpg
| image_caption =
| taxon = Microglossum atropurpureum
| authority = (Batsch) P.Karst. (1885)
| status = VU
| status_system = IUCN3.1
| status_ref = 
| synonyms = *Clavaria atropurpurea Batsch (1783)
Geoglossum atropurpureum (Batsch) Pers. (1796)Leotia atropurpurea (Batsch) Corda (1842)Thuemenidium atropurpureum (Batsch) Kuntze (1891)Corynetes atropurpureus (Batsch) E.J.Durand (1908)Corynetes robustus E.J.Durand (1908)Microglossum robustum (E.J.Durand) Sacc. & Traverso (1911)Leptoglossum robustum (E.J.Durand) Sacc. & Traverso (1911)
}}Microglossum atropurpureum is a species of fungus in the family Leotiaceae. In the UK, it has been given the recommended English name of dark-purple earthtongue. Ascocarps (fruit bodies) are black, often with a purple tint, and are irregularly club-shaped. They occur in soil and resemble earth tongues, but are microscopically distinct. The species was formerly referred to the genus Geoglossum, but is not closely related to the Geoglossomycetes.Microglossum atropurpureum'' is found in eastern North America and Europe, where it is typical of waxcap grasslands, a declining habitat due to changing agricultural practices. As a result, the species is of global conservation concern and is listed as "vulnerable" on the IUCN Red List of Threatened Species.

References

}

Fungi of Europe
Fungi of North America
Fungi described in 1783
Taxa named by August Batsch